This is a list of the Danish Singles Chart number-one hits of 1994 from the International Federation of the Phonographic Industry and Nielsen Soundscan. They were provided through Billboard magazine under the "Hits of the World" section.

Chart history

See also
1994 in music

References

1994 in Denmark
Denmark
Lists of number-one songs in Denmark